Forticom is an IT company based in Latvia. It was the owner of online social networks One.lv (Latvian) and One.lt (Lithuanian). 100% of Forticom is owned by Forticom AS. At this moment the company sold One.lt but the second project One.lv was closed in January 2013.

One website debuted in 1999 and offered the ability send free SMS text messages to mobile phones. The service became very successful as at the time texting was expensive. Later the portal grew to include other mobile services (games, ring tones, icons, etc.). The social network grew out of experimental "friends" feature of the website. The company also developed video sharing websites Videogaga.lt and Videogaga.lv. Both projects are closed at this moment.

In 2007, Forticom bought 25% of Russian Odnoklassniki. In June 2008, the company acquired 70% interest in Polish Nasza-klasa.pl for $92 million. Both websites are designed for former classmates. All the Forticom's stocks of Nasza-klasa.pl were sold.
At this moment company is developing project called Odnoklassniki.ru.

References

Companies of Latvia
Software companies of Latvia
Latvian brands